is a railway station in Kuromatsunai, Suttsu District, Hokkaidō, Japan.

Lines
Hokkaido Railway Company
Hakodate Main Line Station S29

Adjacent stations

Passenger statistics
In fiscal 1992, the station was used by an average of 44 passengers daily.

Surrounding area
  National Route 5
 Roadside station Kuromatsunai
 Kuromatsunai Shindo Kuromatsunai I.C.
 Mount Kuromatsunai

References

Railway stations in Japan opened in 1903
Railway stations in Hokkaido Prefecture